The 2017–18 season is Dundee United's 109th season, having been founded as Dundee Hibernian in 1909. It is their second season in the Scottish Championship, having been relegated from the Scottish Premiership at the end of the 2015–16 season. United will also compete in the Challenge Cup, League Cup and Scottish Cup.

Summary

Management
United began the season under the management of Ray McKinnon, who has signed a three-year contract the previous season. On 24 October 2017, following two consecutive defeats, McKinnon left his position with immediate effect. Assistant manager Laurie Ellis became caretaker manager. On 8 November, United appointed former Heart of Midlothian manager Csaba László as manager on an 18 month contract. Ellis continued as assistant manager.

Results & fixtures

Scottish Championship

Premiership play-off

Scottish League Cup

Group stage

Knockout phase

Scottish Challenge Cup

Scottish Cup

Squad statistics
During the 2017–18 season, United used forty players in competitive games. The table below shows the number of appearances and goals scored by each player.

Appearances

|-
|colspan="12"|Players who left the club during the 2017–18 season
|-

a.  Includes other competitive competitions, including the play-offs and the Challenge Cup.

Club statistics

League table

Division summary

League Cup table

Management statistics
Last updated 21 March 2018

Transfers

Players in

Players out

Loans in

Loans out

See also
 List of Dundee United F.C. seasons

Notes

References

Scottish football clubs 2017–18 season
2017-18